NA-10 Buner is a constituency for the National Assembly of Pakistan. It covers the whole of district Buner. The constituency was formerly known as NA-28 (Buner) from 1977 to 2018. The name changed to NA-10 (Buner) after the delimitation in 2022.

Members of Parliament

1977–2002: NA-28 Buner

2002–2018: NA-28 Buner

2018-2022: NA-9 Buner

Elections since 2002

2002 general election

A total of 2,670 votes were rejected.

2008 general election

A total of 1,805 votes were rejected.

2013 general election

A total of 5,188 votes were rejected.

2018 general election 

General elections were held on 25 July 2018.

†JUI-F, and JI contested as part of MMA

By-election 2023 
A by-election will be held on 19 March 2023 due to the resignation of Sher Akbar Khan, the previous MNA from this seat.

See also
NA-9 Malakand
NA-11 Shangla

References

External links 
Election result's official website

9
9